Major General Mohammad Ali Jafari (born 1 September 1957, also known as Aziz Jafari and Ali Jafari) is a former commander-in-chief of the Iranian Revolutionary Guard Corps from 2007 to 2019. He was appointed by Supreme Leader Ali Khamenei on 1 September 2007, succeeding Major General Yahya Rahim Safavi.

According to a 2 September 2007 report by Radio Free Europe, Radio Farda has described Jafari has been close to the conservative subfaction, which includes Mohsen Rezaee, the secretary of the Expediency Discernment Council and former commander of the IRGC and Mohammad Bagher Ghalibaf, a former IRGC member and the mayor of Tehran. The replacement of Safavi was thought to be a move to strengthen the conservative faction as a counterweight to the radicalizers around President Mahmoud Ahmadinejad, whom Safavi is close to.

"Observers appear to regard Jafari as principally a tactician, organizer, and 'technical' military man," according to Radio Free Europe. The EU's official journal said the three Iranian Revolutionary Guard members, Jafari, General Qasem Soleimani, and the Guard's deputy commander for intelligence, Hossein Taeb, were now subjects to sanctions and had been "providing equipment and support to help the Syrian regime suppress protests in Syria".

Biography
Jafari was born in Yazd and completed his primary and secondary education there. In 1977 he was admitted to Tehran University, where he studied civil (construction) technology. As a student, he participated in anti-Shah protests in Tehran, and was arrested and sent to jail for this. He represented his university department in the Islamic Organization of Tehran University.

At the start of the Iran–Iraq War Jafari fought with the Basij paramilitary force. In 1981 he became a part of the Revolutionary Guards where he rose to serve as a commander of operative battlefields of south and west during the early 1980s. He also participated as an assistant in the operation of Susangerd, and served as commander of the Ashura Battalion, as well as of the Garrisons of Qods and Najaf.

After the war Jafari returned to university to complete his education, and in 1992 he received a degree in civil (construction) technology. In 1992 and 1993, he taught at the War University of the Revolutionary Guards. He was appointed to head "a strategic research center to map out new defensive and military strategies in response to what Iran's leadership has seen as evolving threats in the Middle East", according to Radio Free Europe/Radio Liberty. Jafari is said to have formed many of his ideas on unconventional, or asymmetric warfare at the research center.

Prior to his appointment as leader of the guards, he was also the commander of Sar-Allah Headquarters in Tehran. In 1999, according to Radio Farda, Jafari was among 24 IRGC commanders who signed a letter to President Mohammad Khatami, warning him that his liberalizing policies at a time of civil unrest in Tehran, threatened the country's leadership.

Jafari is a brother-in-law of Mohammad Bagher Zolqadr, a former deputy interior minister.

Asymmetrical warfare knowledge and ties to Iraq
Jafari's work on asymmetrical warfare strategies includes the use of Iranian terrain in mobile-defensive operations and relies on lessons and experiences learned in the Iran–Iraq War. Jafari said in Tehran on 3 September 2007, given "the enemy's" numerical or technological superiority, the IRGC would use asymmetrical warfare capabilities such as those used by Hezbollah in its 2006 conflict with Israel in Lebanon. Iranian strategy would also reflect the strengths and weaknesses of U.S. forces in Afghanistan and Iraq, he said.

On 2 September 2007, Radio Farda reported Jafari has extensive fighting experience and reportedly close relations with the commanders of the former Badr Brigades of the Supreme Council of the Islamic Revolution in Iraq (SCIRI).

See also 
 List of Iranian two-star generals since 1979
 Bahman Reyhani

References

External links

1957 births
Living people
Islamic Revolutionary Guard Corps personnel of the Iran–Iraq War
Islamic Revolutionary Guard Corps major generals
University of Tehran alumni
People from Yazd
Recipients of the Order of Fath
Iranian civil engineers
Iranian individuals subject to the U.S. Department of the Treasury sanctions